The Edvard Peperko Barracks, until July 2012 known as the Franc "Stane" Rozman Barracks, are barracks in Ljubljana, the capital of Slovenia. They are the home of the Slovenian Armed Forces. Before the Slovenia's independence, they belonged to the Yugoslav People's Army. They were built in 1975 at the site of the former Ljubljana airport.

Name
Originally, the barracks were named the Brotherhood and Unity Barracks. Later, they were renamed after the Slovene Partisan commander and Yugoslav people's hero Franc Rozman, a.k.a. Stane. In July 2012, they were renamed after Edvard Peperko (1966–1991), who was among the first Slovenes to die in the Ten-Day War in 1991. The renaming was ordered in June 2012 by Aleš Hojs, the Slovenian Minister of Defence. It was opposed by the Partisan veteran organization, opposition parties, and one of the coalition parties.

Units

Currently
 1st Brigade 
 10 motorized battalion of the Slovenian Armed Forces 
 17 Military Police Battalion, the Slovenian Armed Forces 
 Technical Institute Slovenian Armed Forces 
 Guard of the Slovenian Armed Forces

Former
 12th Guards Battalion of the Slovenian Armed Forces

References

Barracks in Slovenia
Buildings and structures in Ljubljana